West Coast Rail may refer to:

Avanti West Coast
West Coast Railway (Victoria)
West Coast Railway Association
West Coast Railways